is a Japanese actor represented by Owlm. He was a member of Imai Office until 31 March 2015.

Biography
Fukushi auditioned and debuted in the Mizkan advertisement "Kin no Tsubu" in 2001. His drama debut was in the Fuji Television drama The Long Love Letter in 2002 and his first lead role was in 19borders in 2004.  In 2005 Fukushi appeared in the Tokyo Broadcasting System Ai no Gekijō series Teisō Mondō.  He played Tatsuhiko Matsui in the Asadora series Junjō Kitari. Fukushi auditioned twice for the series and he was given the role of the protagonist on the third time.  He later opened an official blog in February 2006.

Fukushi's first terrestrial drama was on the NHK drama Otokomae! which also ran a sequel. In December 2008, he, along with Koichi Otake, Takumi Saito, and Kazuki Namioka, formed the theater unit Run.  It was announced on 1 April 2015 that Fukushi, with Tetsu Watanabe and Masaki Sawai, moved to Owlm.

Filmography

Drama

Drama series

One-off dramas, guest appearances

Other television

Films

Stage

Music videos

Advertisements

Bibliography

DVD

References

External links
 
 

1983 births
Living people
Male actors from Kanagawa Prefecture